TA5 may refer to:

 The Apprentice (U.S. season 5)
 TAAR8, GPCR receptor